Koordersiodendron pinnatum is a species of flowering plant in the family Anacardiaceae. It is tree, commonly called ranggu, found in the Philippines, Sulawesi, Borneo, Celebes, and New Guinea that is also known in the Tagalog language as amugis. It is a relative of the cashew tree. It has edible fruit, but is more often cultivated for its red wood, which is used for building houses and ships.

References

Anacardiaceae
Trees of Malesia
Trees of New Guinea
Taxa named by Francisco Manuel Blanco